The Náprstek Museum is a museum of Asian, African and Native American art located in Bethlehem Square in Prague, Czech Republic. It is one of several permanent exhibitions of the National Museum.  The museum is situated in the former brewing and wine-making compound of U Halanku in the Prague Old Town.

History

The museum, originally private, was founded in 1874 by Czech national revivalist politician Vojtěch Náprstek in his former family brewery, as the Czech Industrial Museum. After his death the museum became the Ethnographic Museum, and since World War II it has been focused on non-European cultures.

In the 19th century the museum was one of the cultural and educational centres of the Czech intelligentsia. Much of its collection comes from Náprstek and his friends who were Czech expatriates, travellers and ethnographers. Only a part of the museum's large collection is available to the public.

References

External links
Naprstek Museum

Collections of the National Museum in Prague
Museums in Prague
Art museums and galleries in the Czech Republic
Asian art museums
1862 establishments in the Austrian Empire